Panagiotis Stylianopoulos (born 4 September 1957) is a Greek former professional footballer who played as full-back. His nickname was "Stilike" derived from the name of Uli Stielike.

Club career
Stylianopoulos started football at the academies of AEK Athens, where he made his first appearance for the men's team on 26 December 1977, still playing for the youth team, due to a strike of the footballers. The following season he was promoted to the men's team and during in the summer of 1980 he was loaned to Atromitos. He returned to club the following year and played in the team until 1988. He played mainly in the full-back positions and was a dynamic and combative footballer who, however, had several competitive shortcomings. In his 10-year spell with the "yellow-blacks" he scored a single goal for the league as he opended the score on 21 February 1987 against Ethnikos Piraeus in a 2–1 home win. With AEK he celebrated the championship  in 1979 and the Cup in 1983. After AEK, he competed in smaller divisions with Korinthos, Ionikos, Thrasyvoulos and Mandraikos.

After football
After the end of his career, Stylianopoulos became a coach, worked for a long time in the AEK academies and  worked for many years at Mandraikos. Ηe is also a very active member of the club of veteran football players of AEK.

Honours

AEK Athens
Alpha Ethniki: 1978–79
Greek Cup: 1982–83

References

1957 births
Living people
Super League Greece players
AEK Athens F.C. players
Atromitos F.C. players
Korinthos F.C. players
Association football defenders
Footballers from Athens
Greek footballers